William St. John Forman (January 20, 1847 – June 10, 1908) was a U.S. Representative from Illinois.

Early life
Born in Natchez, Mississippi, Forman moved with his father to Nashville, Washington County, Illinois, in 1851. He attended the public schools, and Washington Seminary, Richview, Illinois. He studied law, was admitted to the bar in 1870, and commenced practice in Nashville, Illinois.

Career
He served as mayor of Nashville, Illinois from 1878 to 1884, and was a delegate to all State and National Democratic Conventions from 1876 to 1896. He was a member of the Illinois Senate from 1884 to 1888. Forman was elected as a Democrat to the Fifty-first, Fifty-second, and Fifty-third Congresses (March 4, 1889 - March 3, 1895). He served as chairman of the Committee on Militia during the Fifty-third Congress.

Forman moved to East St. Louis, Illinois in 1895, where he resumed practicing law. He was an unsuccessful candidate as a Gold Standard Democrat for election as governor in 1896. He was appointed by President Grover Cleveland as Commissioner of Internal Revenue and served from 1896 to 1897. Forman died in Champaign, Illinois on June 10, 1908. He was interred in Masonic Cemetery, Nashville, Illinois.

References

1847 births
1908 deaths
Politicians from Natchez, Mississippi
People from Nashville, Illinois
Commissioners of Internal Revenue
Illinois lawyers
Democratic Party Illinois state senators
Mayors of places in Illinois
Democratic Party members of the United States House of Representatives from Illinois
19th-century American politicians